John Lowe is an American retired sportswriter.

In 1985, while writing for The Philadelphia Inquirer, Lowe invented the quality start statistic. He wrote that it "shows exactly how many times a baseball pitcher has done his job." The next year, he joined the Detroit Free Press to cover the Detroit Tigers. In December 2022, Lowe was named as the recipient of the BBWAA Career Excellence Award.

Lowe graduated from the University of Southern California (USC) and worked for the Los Angeles Daily News early in his career. He served as president of the Baseball Writers' Association of America (BBWAA), and in 2012 was named Michigan sports writer of the year. He retired in 2014.

References

Living people
American sportswriters
The Philadelphia Inquirer people
Detroit Free Press people
Year of birth missing (living people)
University of Southern California alumni